Acacia stereophylla is a tree or shrub belonging to the genus Acacia and the subgenus Juliflorae that is endemic to south western Australia.

Description
It has glabrous branchlets that are hairy in the axils. Like most species of Acacia it has phyllodes rather than true leaves. The evergreen phyllodes are ascending to erect with a straight to shallowly incurved shape. It blooms from June or August to October producing yellow flowers.

Taxonomy
There are two varieties:
 Acacia stereophylla var. cylindrata
 Acacia stereophylla var. stereophylla

Distribution
It is native to a large area in the Mid West and Wheatbelt region of Western Australia. The bulk of the population of found from around Kalbarri National Park in the north west down to around Tammin in the south east and to around Boorabbin in the east.

See also
List of Acacia species

References

stereophylla
Acacias of Western Australia
Plants described in 1848
Taxa named by Carl Meissner